St. John's Island or St. John Island may refer to:

 Saint John, U.S. Virgin Islands, an island of the U.S. Virgin Islands
 Saint John's Island, Singapore
 St. John's Island, Canada, former name of Prince Edward Island to 1798
 St. John's Island, Egypt
 Shangchuan Island or Saint John Island, China, originally from São João ("Saint John" in Portuguese)
 St. Ivan Island, in Bulgaria (Ivan is the Bulgarian name corresponding to John)